Merced County Transit, also known as "The Bus", provides public bus transportation services throughout Merced County in the Central Valley and San Joaquin Valley areas of California. Vehicles are owned and maintained by Transit Joint Powers Authority for Merced County with daily operations conducted by a private contractor.

History
The Bus was formed in 1996 by consolidating four local transit service providers.

Merced Transportation Center
Located in the former Southern Pacific railway station, the downtown transportation center serves as the hub for Merced's local, regional and national bus service. Greyhound provides bus service to Sacramento, the Bay Area, and Los Angeles. YARTS and VIA Adventures provide bus service to Yosemite National Park. Situated at the same location, the California Welcome Center carries souvenirs, maps, and brochures for visitors, as well as YARTS bus tickets.

Fleet
The fleet consists fixed-route transit buses (larger heavy-duty buses and smaller cutaway buses) as well as ADA Paratransit and Dial-A-Ride cutaway buses and vans. The fixed-route fleet consists of seven 2011 Gillig Low Floor Diesel 29' coaches which are in the process of being phased out (numbered M-150 through M-156), two 2012 and five 2013 Gillig Low Floor Diesel 40' coaches (M-157 and M-158 are 2012 models and M-159 through M-163 are 2013 models), six 2015 Gillig Diesel 35' coaches (numbered M-164 through M-169), and four 2017 Gillig Diesel 35' coaches (numbered M-170 through M-173) which replaced four 2003 Gillig Phantoms that were retired in late 2017, and seven 2021 Gillig Low Floor Clean Diesel 35' coaches (numbered 3501 through 3507) which are replacements for the seven 2011 29' models. The fixed-route fleet also consists of 19 2014 and 2016 Chevrolet Arboc Spirit of Mobility cutaway buses (2014 models numbered M-419 through M-429 and 2016 models numbered M-430 through M-437) for use on local and low ridership routes. They began the greening of their fleet in 2006 with the purchase of 9 "clean air" Orion VII models and planned the construction of a compressed natural gas fueling facility. These buses were later replaced in 2015 by a combination of six Gillig Diesel buses and a small fleet of Chevrolet Arboc gasoline fueled cutaways. In late 2019 and early 2020, The Bus was awarded grant funding to begin the transition to a zero-emission electric bus fleet. The first set of five New Flyer XE40 battery electric buses are expected to arrive in early 2023, with the next set of four Gillig battery electric buses estimated to arrive in early 2024.

Services
15 fixed bus routes and 2 on-demand services are provided 7 days a week (with the exception of the UC route which is Weekdays only) operate within the city of Merced and throughout the county, as well as the city of Turlock in neighboring Stanislaus County.  However, the unincorporated community of Hilmar-Irwin which has a combined population of over 5,000 appears not to have any of The Bus services, even though it is located within Merced County, along with the community of Snelling.

References

External links
 

Bus transportation in California
Transportation in Merced County, California
Merced County Transit